Benkovski Nunatak (\ben-'kov-ski 'nu-na-tak\) is a rocky peak of elevation 450 m projecting from the ice cap of Greenwich Island in the northeast extremity of Breznik Heights.

The peak was named after Georgi Benkovski (1843–76), a leader of the 1876 April Uprising for Bulgarian independence.

Location
Overlooking Gruev Cove to the east. Bulgarian topographic survey Tangra 2004/05.

Maps
 L.L. Ivanov. Antarctica: Livingston Island and Greenwich, Robert, Snow and Smith Islands. Scale 1:120000 topographic map.  Troyan: Manfred Wörner Foundation, 2009.

References
 Benkovski Nunatak. SCAR Composite Gazetteer of Antarctica
 Bulgarian Antarctic Gazetteer. Antarctic Place-names Commission. (details in Bulgarian, basic data in English)

External links
 Benkovski Nunatak. Copernix satellite image

Nunataks of Greenwich Island
Bulgaria and the Antarctic